Mika Pekka Raatikainen (born 7 November 1961) is a Finnish politician, policeman and a member of Finnish Parliament, representing the Finns Party. Raatikainen was born in Helsinki. He was first elected as a substitute member to the parliament in 2011, and became member of parliament on 4 July 2014, when Jussi Halla-aho left to the European Parliament. In the 2015 parliamentary election, Raatikainen got 3,370 votes and got elected.

Raatikainen was not re-elected in the 2019 parliamentary election, but again took the seat of Halla-aho as a substitute in April 2019, due to Halla-aho's ongoing term in the European Parliament.

Before a career in the politics, Raatikainen had a long career in the Helsinki Police Department, in which he started working in 1983. He has a Lebanese wife, who he first met in Italy in 2006.

References

1961 births
Living people
Politicians from Helsinki
Finns Party politicians
Members of the Parliament of Finland (2011–15)
Members of the Parliament of Finland (2015–19)
Members of the Parliament of Finland (2019–23)